The State Street subway is an underground section of the Chicago "L" system in The Loop which serves as the center of the Red Line. It owes its name to State Street which it runs below. Since the subway is operated by the Red Line, it serves passengers 24 hours a day/7 days a week and 365 days a year.

The subway is notable for having the longest railway platform in both North America and the Western Hemisphere, shared by all stations from Lake Street to Jackson Boulevard.

History
The State Street subway project was funded by New Deal programs established by Franklin D. Roosevelt during the Great Depression. In 1937, the city of Chicago successfully applied for a federal grant and loan from the Works Progress Administration to fund the construction of two subway tunnels, the first of which would be built beneath State Street and the second beneath Milwaukee Avenue and Dearborn Street.

On December 17, 1938, the city of Chicago began construction of the State Street subway at the intersection of State Street and Chicago Avenue.  The tunnel was buried deep to enable the use of a tunnel boring machine throughout the construction of the subway.  Only brief sections were built using the "cut-and-cover' method. Unlike the Milwaukee-Dearborn subway, no delays occurred in construction and the subway opened for revenue service on October 17, 1943.

In November 1985, work began to extend the State Street subway from its original portal at 13th and State Street, where it connected to the South Side main Line, and the Englewood and Jackson Park branches, in order to connect the State Street subway to the Dan Ryan branch. The subway extension was completed by January 25, 1990, but did not immediately enter passenger service. On February 21, 1993, the CTA color-coded the lines and made the State Street subway and Dan Ryan Branch part of the present day Red Line. Trains were rerouted through the new subway extension to the Dan Ryan Branch which runs to 95th/Dan Ryan, while the South Side Elevated branch became part of the present day Green Line.

On April 13, 1992, during the Chicago flood  of water poured into Chicago's subways and the basements of nearby buildings. Service through the State Street subway was stopped temporarily, while water was pumped out of the tunnels.

On November 18, 1997, the station at Lake permanently opened as an independent station, offering transfers to the elevated State/Lake station. Lake was originally part of the Washington station. On October 23, 2006, the Washington station closed due to the Block 37 project.

In May 2022, the Chicago station was the location of the Magnificent Mile shooting.

Station listing

Image gallery

References

Railway lines in Chicago
Chicago Transit Authority